Alex or Aleck Miller (originally Ford, possibly December 5, 1912 – May 24, 1965), known later in his career as Sonny Boy Williamson, was an American blues harmonica player, singer and songwriter. He was an early and influential blues harp stylist who recorded successfully in the 1950s and 1960s. Miller used various names, including Rice Miller and Little Boy Blue, before calling himself Sonny Boy Williamson, which was also the name of a popular Chicago blues singer and harmonica player. To distinguish the two, Miller has been referred to as Sonny Boy Williamson II.

He first recorded with Elmore James on "Dust My Broom". Some of his popular songs include "Don't Start Me Talkin'", "Help Me", "Checkin' Up on My Baby", and "Bring It On Home".  He toured Europe with the American Folk Blues Festival and recorded with English rock musicians, including the Yardbirds and Animals. "Help Me" became a blues standard, and many blues and rock artists have recorded his songs.

Biography

Early days
Miller's date and place of birth are disputed. There are various opinions about his year of birth, five of which are 1897, 1899, 1907, 1909, and 1912.  According to David Evans, professor of music and an ethnomusicologist at the University of Memphis, census records indicate that Miller was born in about 1912, being seven years old on February 2, 1920, the day of the census. Miller's gravestone at Tutwiler, Mississippi, set up by record company owner Lillian McMurry twelve years after his death, gives his date of birth as March 11, 1908.  In a spoken word performance called “The Story of Sonny Boy Williamson” that was later included in several compilations, Miller states that he was born in Glendora, Mississippi in 1897.   According to researchers Bob Eagle and Eric S. LeBlanc, he was born in the small community of Money, near Greenwood, Mississippi, in 1912.

He lived and worked with his sharecropper stepfather, Jim Miller, whose last name he soon adopted, and mother, Millie Ford, until the early 1930s. Beginning in the 1930s, he traveled around Mississippi and Arkansas and encountered Big Joe Williams, Elmore James and Robert Lockwood Jr., also known as Robert Junior Lockwood, who would play guitar on his later Checker Records sides. He was also associated with Robert Johnson during this period. Miller developed his style and raffish stage persona during these years. Willie Dixon recalled seeing Lockwood and Miller playing for tips in Greenville, Mississippi, in the 1930s. He entertained audiences with novelties such as inserting one end of the harmonica into his mouth and playing with no hands. At this time he was often known as "Rice" Miller—a childhood nickname stemming from his love of rice and milk—or as "Little Boy Blue".

In 1941 Miller was hired to play the King Biscuit Time show, advertising the King Biscuit brand of baking flour on radio station KFFA in Helena, Arkansas, with Lockwood. The program's sponsor, Max Moore, began billing Miller as Sonny Boy Williamson, apparently in an attempt to capitalize on the fame of the well-known Chicago-based harmonica player and singer Sonny Boy Williamson (birth name John Lee Curtis Williamson, died 1948). Although John Lee Williamson was a major blues star who had already released dozens of successful and widely influential records under the name "Sonny Boy Williamson" from 1937 onward, Miller would later claim to have been the first to use the name. Some blues scholars believe that Miller's assertion he was born in 1899 was a ruse to convince audiences he was old enough to have used the name before John Lee Williamson, who was born in 1914.

Radio show in West Memphis
In 1949, Williamson relocated to West Memphis, Arkansas, and lived with Howlin' Wolf. (Later, for Checker Records, he did a parody of Howlin' Wolf, entitled "Like Wolf".) He started his own KWEM radio show from 1948 to 1950, selling the elixir Hadacol. He brought his King Biscuit musician friends to West Memphis—Elmore James, Houston Stackhouse, Arthur "Big Boy" Crudup, Robert Nighthawk and others—to perform on KWEM radio. Williamson married Howlin' Wolf's half-sister Mae and he showed Wolf how to play harmonica.

Recording career
Williamson's first recording session took place in 1951 for Lillian McMurry of Trumpet Records, based in Jackson, Mississippi.  It was three years since the death of John Lee Williamson, which for the first time allowed some legitimacy to Miller's carefully worded claim to being "the one and only Sonny Boy Williamson". When Trumpet went bankrupt in 1955, Williamson's recording contract was yielded to its creditors, who sold it to Chess Records in Chicago. He had begun developing a following in Chicago beginning in 1953, when he appeared there as a member of Elmore James's band. During his Chess years he enjoyed his greatest success and acclaim, recording about 70 songs for the Chess subsidiary Checker Records from 1955 to 1964. His first LP record was a compilation of previously released singles.  Titled Down and Out Blues, Checker released the collection in 1959.  A single, "Boppin' with Sonny" backed with "No Nights by Myself", was released by Ace Records in 1955.

In 1972, Chess released This Is My Story, a compilation album featuring Williamson's recordings for the label. It was later included in Robert Christgau's "basic record library" of 1950s and 1960s recordings, published in Christgau's Record Guide: Rock Albums of the Seventies (1981).

1960s European tours
In the early 1960s he toured Europe several times during the height of the British blues craze, backed on a number of occasions by the Authentics (see American Folk Blues Festival), recording with the Yardbirds (for the album Sonny Boy Williamson and the Yardbirds) and the Animals, and appearing on several television broadcasts throughout Europe. Around this time he was quoted as saying of the backing bands who accompanied him, "those British boys want to play the blues real bad, and they do". Led Zeppelin biographer Stephen Davis writes in Hammer of the Gods, while in England Williamson set his hotel room on fire while trying to cook a rabbit in a coffee percolator. The book also maintains that future Led Zeppelin vocalist Robert Plant stole one of the bluesman's harmonicas at one of these shows.

Sonny Boy took a liking to the European fans, and while there had a custom-made, two-tone suit tailored personally for him, along with a bowler hat, matching umbrella, and an attaché case for his harmonicas. He appears credited as "Big Skol" on Roland Kirk's live album Kirk in Copenhagen (1963).

Death
Upon his return to the U.S., he resumed playing the King Biscuit Time show on KFFA, and performed in the Helena, Arkansas area. As fellow musicians Houston Stackhouse and Peck Curtis waited at the KFFA studios for Williamson on May 25, 1965, the 12:15 broadcast time was approaching and Williamson was nowhere in sight. Peck left the radio station to locate Williamson, and discovered his body in bed at the rooming house where he had been staying, dead of an apparent heart attack suffered in his sleep the night before.  Williamson is buried on New Africa Road, just outside Tutwiler, Mississippi at the site of the former Whitman Chapel cemetery.  Trumpet Records owner McMurry provided the headstone with an incorrect date of death.

Naming
The recordings made by John Lee Williamson between 1937 and his death in 1948 and those made between 1951 and 1964 by "Rice" Miller were all originally issued under the name Sonny Boy Williamson. It is believed that Miller adopted the name to suggest to audiences (and to his first record label) that he was the "original" Sonny Boy. To differentiate between the two musicians, scholars and biographers have referred to John Lee Williamson (1914–1948) as "Sonny Boy Williamson I" or "the original Sonny Boy" and to Miller (circa 1912–1965) as "Sonny Boy Williamson II".

Legacy 
In 2014, Williamson was honored with a marker on the Mississippi Blues Trail in Helena, Arkansas.

Discography

Albums
Down and Out Blues (Chess, 1959)
A Portrait in Blues (1963)
The Blues of Sonny Boy Williamson (1963)
Sonny Boy Williamson and Memphis Slim (1964)
Sonny Boy Williamson and the Yardbirds (Fontana, 1966)
The Real Folk Blues (Chess, 1957-64 [1966])
More Real Folk Blues (1966)
Don't Send Me No Flowers (1968)
Bummer Road (1969)
Rock Generation Vol. 4 with the Animals (1973)
King Biscuit Time (1989)

Singles and EPs
"Cool, Cool Blues" / "Do It if You Wanta" (Trumpet Records, 1951)
"Crazy 'Bout You, Baby" / "Eyesight to the Blind" (Trumpet, 1951)
"Pontiac Blues" / "Sonny Boy's Christmas Blues" (Trumpet, 1951)
"Mighty Long Time" / "Nine Below Zero" (Trumpet, 1951)
"Come On Back Home" / "Stop Crying" (Trumpet, 1951)
"Going in Your Direction" / "Red Hot Kisses" (Trumpet, 1954)
"Don't Start Me Talkin'"/ "All My Love in Vain" (Checker Records, 1955)
"Keep It to Yourself" / "The Key (To Your Door)" (Checker, 1956)
"Let Me Explain" / "Your Imagination" (Checker, 1956)
"No Nights by Myself" / "Boppin' with Sonny" (Ace Records, 1956)
"Fattening Frogs for Snakes" / "I Don't Know" (Checker, 1957)
"Cross My Heart" / "Dissatisfied'" (Checker, 1958)
"Born Blind" / "Ninety-Nine" (Checker, 1958)
"Your Funeral and My Trial" / "Wake Up Baby" (Checker, 1958)
"Let Your Conscience Be Your Guide" / "Unseeing Eye" (Checker, 1959)
"Temperature 110" / "Lonesome Cabin" (Checker, 1960)
"Trust My Baby" / "Too Close Together" (Checker, 1960)
"The Goat" / "It's Sad to Be Alone" (Checker, 1960)
"Stop Right Now" / "The Hunt" (Checker, 1961)
"The Hunt" / "Little Village" (Checker, 1961)
"One Way Out" / "Nine Below Zero" (Checker, 1962)
"Trying to Get Back on My Feet" / "Decoration Day" (Checker, 1963)
"Bye Bye Bird" / "Help Me" (Checker, 1963)
"My Younger Days" / "I Want You Close to Me" (Checker,1964)
"Bring It On Home" / "Down Child" (Checker, 1965)
"Baby Let Me Come Back Home" / "November Boogie" / "All Nite Boogie" / "Leavin Blues" (Collectors Special Records EP, 1966)

Compilations
In Memoriam (1965, reissued as The Real Folk Blues, 1966)
Blues Classics by "The Original" Sonny Boy Williamson (1965)
This Is My Story (1972)

As Sonny Boy Williamson His Harmonica and Houserockers
Singles
"Too Close Together" / "Cat Hop" (Trumpet Records, 1953)
"Gettin' Out of Town" / "She Brought Life Back to the Dead" (Trumpet, 1954)
"Empty Bedroom" / "From the Bottom" (Trumpet, 1955)
"Mr. Downchild" / "Stop Now Baby" (Trumpet, 1954)
"I Cross My Heart" / "West Memphis Blues" (Trumpet, 1954)
"Come on Back Home" / "Stop Crying" (Trumpet, 1954)
"From the Bottom" / "Empty Bedroom" (Blue Horizon Records)

Notes

References

Year of birth uncertain
1912 births
1965 deaths
20th-century American musicians
Ace Records (United States) artists
African-American songwriters
American blues harmonica players
American blues singers
Blues musicians from Mississippi
Checker Records artists
Chicago blues musicians
Delta blues musicians
Electric blues musicians
Harmonica blues musicians
Mississippi Blues Trail
People from Tallahatchie County, Mississippi
Songwriters from Mississippi
Trumpet Records artists
Songwriters from Illinois
Age controversies
20th-century African-American musicians